Welf I (or Hwelf; died about 825) is the first documented ancestor of the Elder House of Welf. He is mentioned as a count (comes) in the Frankish lands of Altorf in Alamannia. He is the son of Rothard of the Argengau and grandson of Hardrad.

Life
Welf originated from a distinguished dynasty of Franconian nobles. He is mentioned only once: on the occasion of the wedding of his daughter Judith to Emperor Louis the Pious in 819 at Aachen. His son Conrad later appeared as a dux (duke) in Alamannia and achieved a powerful position in the Upper Swabian estates he possibly had inherited from his mother Hedwig.

His family became politically powerful when Louis the Pious chose Welf's oldest daughter as his second wife upon the death of his consort Ermengarde of Hesbaye. Though Welf himself never became publicly prominent, his family became interwoven with the Carolingian dynasty.

Marriage and issue 
Welf married Hedwig (Heilwig), daughter of the Saxon count Isambart; Hedwig later became abbess of Chelles. The couple had the following children:
 Judith of Bavaria (–843); married Louis the Pious, who was King of the Franks and co-emperor of the Holy Roman Empire with his father, Charlemagne.
 Conrad (–864), Count of Auxerre; ancestor of the Welf kings of Burgundy.
 Rudolph (–866), Count of Ponthieu.
 Hemma (–876); married King Louis the German, King of East Francia and son of Louis the Pious.

References

Sources
 

Elder House of Welf
Nobility of the Carolingian Empire
770s births
820s deaths
Year of birth uncertain
Year of death uncertain